Willie Peeters (born October 26, 1965) is a Dutch mixed martial artist. He competed in the Heavyweight division.

Biography
Peeters started his career in amateur wrestling at the age of ten, training with famed champion Freddy Winters and winning several junior competitions across Europe. At sixteen, he moved to the Oyama Gym in Amsterdam, where he trained judo under Chris Dolman and Willem Ruska, as well as kickboxing under Jan Lomulder, and finally Kyokushin karate, winning a heavyweight championship. In 1991, after talking about his interest in mixed martial arts, Dolman invited him to his team in Fighting Network RINGS in order to compete in both MMA and professional wrestling in Japan.

Peeters would develop a rivalry with Wataru Sakata in a long series of shootfighting bouts. Peeters defeated Wataru by TKO on their first fight On November 16, 1995, and they went to fight a rematch on June 29, 1996. During the latter, Sakata released late a toehold, injuring Peeters, who retaliated by illegally knocking him out with a close-fisted punch, gaining a red card. Still, Peeters would win by KO due palm strikes. The two met again on August 24, where Peeters dominated in a grappling contest and defeated Sakata north/south choke. Willie would face Sakata again under different rules in a RINGS Holland event on February 8, 1998, but although Wataru performed dominantly for the first time, he lost a controversial decision, as the Dutch referee invalidated a finishing hold by Sakata while allowing Peeters to throw illegal strikes. Peeters finally lost to Sakata on June 27 by ankle lock.

On July 1, 1999, Peeters fought in Brazilian promotion World Vale Tudo Championship against Antonio Carlos Ribiero. The match, which was lost by Peeters by doctor stoppage, saw copious amounts of blood and Willie biting his opponent, and it was followed by a brawl between their teams.

Mixed martial arts record

|-
| Loss
| align=center| 9-10-1
| Heath Herring
| Submission (rear-naked choke)
| Pride 9
| 
| align=center| 1
| align=center| 0:48
| Nagoya, Japan
| 
|-
| Win
| align=center| 9-9-1
| Yasuhito Namekawa
| TKO (knee to the body)
| Rings Holland: There Can Only Be One Champion
| 
| align=center| 2
| align=center| 4:56
| Utrecht, Netherlands
| 
|-
| Draw
| align=center| 8-9-1
| Peter Varga
| Draw
| BOA 1: Battle of Arnhem 1
| 
| align=center| 0
| align=center| 0:00
| Netherlands
| 
|-
| Loss
| align=center| 8-9
| Chris Haseman
| Submission (kneebar)
| Rings: Rise 5th
| 
| align=center| 1
| align=center| 3:13
| Japan
| 
|-
| Loss
| align=center| 8-8
| Antonio Carlos Ribeiro
| TKO (cut)
| WVC 8: World Vale Tudo Championship 8
| 
| align=center| 1
| align=center| 5:56
| Aruba
| 
|-
| Loss
| align=center| 8-7
| Ryuki Ueyama
| TKO (lost points)
| Rings: Rise 4th
| 
| align=center| 3
| align=center| 3:05
| Japan
| 
|-
| Loss
| align=center| 8-6
| Wataru Sakata
| Submission
| Rings: Fourth Fighting Integration
| 
| align=center| 1
| align=center| 1:45
| Tokyo, Japan
| 
|-
| Win
| align=center| 8-5
| Wataru Sakata
| Decision (unanimous)
| Rings Holland: The King of Rings
| 
| align=center| 2
| align=center| 5:00
| Amsterdam, North Holland, Netherlands
| 
|-
| Loss
| align=center| 7-5
| Sean Alvarez
| N/A
| Rings: Mega Battle Tournament 1997 Semifinal
| 
| align=center| 1
| align=center| 9:40
| Japan
| 
|-
| Win
| align=center| 7-4
| Sergei Sousserov
| KO (palm strikes)
| Rings Holland: The Final Challenge
| 
| align=center| 1
| align=center| 4:51
| Amsterdam, North Holland, Netherlands
| 
|-
| Loss
| align=center| 6-4
| Tom Erikson
| Submission (neck crank)
| MARS: Martial Arts Reality Superfighting
| 
| align=center| 1
| align=center| 0:31
| Birmingham, Alabama, United States
| 
|-
| Win
| align=center| 6-3
| Serge Narsisyan
| TKO (corner stoppage)
| MARS: Martial Arts Reality Superfighting
| 
| align=center| 1
| align=center| 5:10
| Birmingham, Alabama, United States
| 
|-
| Loss
| align=center| 5-3
| Mitsuya Nagai
| N/A
| Rings: Battle Dimensions Tournament 1996 Opening Round
| 
| align=center| 0
| align=center| 0:00
| 
| 
|-
| Win
| align=center| 5-2
| Wataru Sakata
| Submission (neck lock)
| Rings: Maelstrom 6
| 
| align=center| 1
| align=center| 18:31
| Japan
| 
|-
| Win
| align=center| 4-2
| Eduardo Rocha
| TKO (submission to punches)
| CFT 2: Cage Fight Tournament 2
| 
| align=center| 1
| align=center| 1:51
| Netherlands
| 
|-
| Win
| align=center| 3-2
| Hubert Numrich
| TKO (punches and headbutts)
| CFT 2: Cage Fight Tournament 2
| 
| align=center| 1
| align=center| 2:06
| Netherlands
| 
|-
| Win
| align=center| 2-2
| Allen Harris
| TKO (punches)
| CFT 2: Cage Fight Tournament 2
| 
| align=center| 1
| align=center| 1:37
| Netherlands
| 
|-
| Loss
| align=center| 1-2
| Tsuyoshi Kosaka
| Submission (rear-naked choke)
| Rings Holland: Kings of Martial Arts
| 
| align=center| 2
| align=center| 0:12
| Amsterdam, North Holland, Netherlands
| 
|-
| Loss
| align=center| 1-1
| Chris Haseman
| N/A
| Rings: Budokan Hall 1996
| 
| align=center| 0
| align=center| 0:00
| Tokyo, Japan
| 
|-
| Win
| align=center| 1-0
| Masayuki Naruse
| Decision (unanimous)
| Rings Holland: Free Fight
| 
| align=center| 1
| align=center| 10:00
| Amsterdam, North Holland, Netherlands
|

See also
List of male mixed martial artists

References

External links
 
 Willie Peeters at mixedmartialarts.com
 Willie Peeters at fightmatrix.com

1965 births
Living people
Dutch male mixed martial artists
Heavyweight mixed martial artists
Mixed martial artists utilizing Kyokushin kaikan
Mixed martial artists utilizing kickboxing
Mixed martial artists utilizing wrestling
Mixed martial artists utilizing judo
Dutch male sport wrestlers
Amateur wrestlers
Dutch male judoka
Dutch male karateka
Sportspeople from Nijmegen
20th-century Dutch people
21st-century Dutch people